Darko Perić (born 25 March 1977) is a Serbian actor. He is best known for playing Helsinki in the Spanish crime thriller series La Casa de Papel (Money Heist).

Early life 
Perić was born in Kladovo on 25 March 1977. He showed interest in the arts from a very young age; his first time onstage came at the age of six, when a Cuban singer invited him to sing "Guantanamera". That moment inspired him to perform in every school play. In 1991, at the start of the Yugoslav Wars, his dreams of going to animation school in Zagreb were halted. His parents decided that he should instead become a doctor. He was sent to veterinary school in Bucharest in Romania, where he rediscovered his passion for the cinema and theatre thanks to his student friends at the Romanian Film Academy. During that time, he continued to study medicine while acting in short films.

In 1994, Perić moved to the Romanian city of Timișoara, where he continued his studies of medicine and performed in live theatre. After six years of living in Timișoara, he finished his studies and graduated with honours in veterinary medicine. While there, he had also gotten involved in the local hardcore and punk scenes, singing in bands and organizing events in the local cultural centre, where he met many international artists. This inspired him to move to Germany, where he settled in Berlin. He continued to act in short films there until 2004, when he moved to Spain and chose Barcelona as a place to live.

Career
Perić was cast in his first major Spanish job in the series Crematorio for Canal + in 2010. In 2015, he performed in A Perfect Day. In 2016, he was cast in the Atresmedia produced series Sea of Plastic / Mar de plástico, in which he played Oso, a Ukrainian gangster and the main villain in the series. His best known role is of Helsinki in the crime thriller series Money Heist (2017–2021). The series was acquired by Netflix, which helped it become one of the most watched shows, winning the Best Drama at the Emmy Awards in 2018.

Personal life
Perić teaches Qigong around the world in masterclasses titled "Qigong: Physical and Mental Preparation for Actors". He is an avid basketball fan.

Filmography

Film

Television

References

External links
 

1977 births
Living people
Serbian male television actors
20th-century Serbian male actors
21st-century Serbian male actors
People from Kladovo